The year 1953 in architecture involved some significant events.

Events
 Gordon Ryder and Peter Yates form an architectural practice based in Newcastle upon Tyne in the north of England.

Buildings and structures completed

 Main building of Moscow State University, the tallest building in Europe (1953–1990) and the tallest educational building in the world (1953–present), designed by Lev Rudnev.
 St Crispin's School, Wokingham, Berkshire, England, designed by the U.K. Ministry of Education.
 YMCA Indian Student Hostel, Fitzrovia, London, designed by Ralph Tubbs.
 Housing at Chandigarh, Punjab (India), designed by Le Corbusier in collaboration with Pierre Jeanneret, Jane Drew, Maxwell Fry, B. V. Doshi and others.
 Mardyke Road (residential crescent), Harlow New Town, England, designed by Frederick Gibberd.
 Air Forces Memorial, Runnymede, England, designed by Edward Maufe, dedicated October 17.
 English Martyrs' Church, Wallasey, designed by F. X. Velarde, dedicated August 31.
 New building for Yale University Art Gallery, New Haven, Connecticut, the first major commission for Louis Kahn, opened November.
 Lijnbaan pedestrianised shopping street in Rotterdam, designed by Jo van den Broek and Jacob B. Bakema.

Awards
American Academy of Arts and Letters Gold Medal – Frank Lloyd Wright.
 AIA Gold Medal – William Adams Delano.
 RIBA Royal Gold Medal – Le Corbusier.
 Grand Prix de Rome, architecture – Olivier-Clément Cacoub.

Publications
 Ivan Chtcheglov (as Gilles Ivain) – Formulaire pour un urbanisme nouveau.
 John Summerson –  Architecture in Britain, 1530–1830.

Births
March 26 - Phil Freelon, American architect (Died. 2019)
 November 7 – Peter Janesch, Hungarian architect
 December 18 – David Chipperfield, English architect
 Sheila O'Donnell, Irish architect
 Richard Weston, English architect

Deaths
 May 31 – Vladimir Tatlin, Soviet Russian architect (born 1885)
 August 17 – Sir Banister Fletcher, English architectural historian (born 1866)
 September 15 – Erich Mendelsohn, German-born architect (born 1887)
 December 13 – Ad van der Steur, Dutch architect (born 1893)

References